The Ministry of Tourism, Handicrafts and Social and Solidarity Economy is the Moroccan ministry in charge of the preparation and implementation national strategies with regards to tourism, the supervision and support of tourism and handicraft professionals, and the development of air transport as an important part of tourism. It also supervises various organizations and institutions specialized in vocational training and qualification in the tourism and hospitality industry.

Institutions affiliated with the Ministry 
The Ministry of Tourism, Air Transport, Craft & Social Economy supervises many institutions related to the Ministry's responsibilities:

 Moroccan National Tourist Office ONMT
 SMIT - Moroccan Tourist Engineering Company
 ONDA - National Airports Office
 Directorate General of Civil Aviation (DGAC)

See also 

 Government of Morocco

References

External links 

 Website

Government ministries of Morocco